Events of 2022 in Kenya.

Incumbents 
 President: Uhuru Kenyatta
 Deputy President: William Ruto

Events
Ongoing – COVID-19 pandemic in Kenya

January and February

Predicted and scheduled events
 August 9 - 2022 Kenyan general election

Deaths

January 
 2 January
 Charles Njonjo, Attorney General of Kenya (1963–1979) (b. 1920).
 Richard Leakey, Kenyan paleoanthropologist and conservationist (b. 1944).

April
 21 April
 Mwai Kibaki, 3rd President of Kenya (2002–2013) (b. 1931).

December 

 29 December, Catherine Kasavuli, journalist (b. 1962)

See also

COVID-19 pandemic in Africa
2020s
African Union
East African Community
African Continental Free Trade Area
Common Market for Eastern and Southern Africa

References

External links

 
2020s in Kenya
Years of the 21st century in Kenya
Kenya
Kenya